Euptoieta claudia, the variegated fritillary, is a North and South American butterfly in the family Nymphalidae. Even though the variegated fritillary has some very different characteristics from the Speyeria fritillaries, it is still closely related to them. Some of the differences are: variegated fritillaries have two or three broods per year vs. one per year in Speyeria; they are nomadic vs. sedentary; and they use a wide range of host plants vs. just violets. And because of their use of passionflowers as a host plant, variegated fritillaries also have taxonomic links to the heliconians. Their flight is low and swift, but even when resting or nectaring, this species is extremely difficult to approach, and, because of this, its genus name was taken from the Greek word euptoietos meaning "easily scared".

Description

The upperside of the wings is checkered with orange and black. Both the forewing and hindwing have a row of submarginal black spots and black median lines running across the wings. The underside of the forewing is orange with a pale orange spot rimmed in black in the forewing cell. The underside of the hindwing is mottled with browns and grays with a pale postmedian band. There is no silvering. The wingspan measures 1.75–2.25 inches (44–57 mm).

Similar species
In the variegated fritillary's range, the only similar species is the Mexican fritillary (Euptoieta hegesia). The Mexican fritillary is brighter orange, the upper side of its hindwing basal area is unmarked, and the underside of its wings is plainer, with no submarginal spots or median black lines.

Flight period
This species may be seen flying from April to October in the south, while in the north it flies from summer to early fall.

Habitat
This butterfly is often found in open, disturbed habitats such as clover and alfalfa fields, pastures, fields, waste areas, roadsides, and mountain meadows.

Nectar plants
Here is a list of some of the flowers that the variegated fritillary uses as nectar plants:
Dogbane, Apocynum species
Common milkweed, Asclepias syriaca
Asters, Aster sp.
Bearded beggarticks, Bidens aristosa
Thistles, Cirsium sp.
Coneflowers, Echinacea sp.
Fleabane, Erigeron sp.
Common boneset, Eupatorium perfoliatum
Alfalfa, Medicago sativa
Red clover, Trifolium pratense
Ironweed, Vernonia sp.
Sedum, Sedum

Life cycle

Males actively patrol for females. Females lay their pale-green or cream-colored eggs singly on host plant leaves and stems. The larva eats the leaves, flowers, and stems of the food plant. The larva is red with black subdorsal and spiracular stripes infused with white spotting. In many individuals, the white is more conspicuous than the black. The red middorsal stripe bears white (sometimes black) oval-shaped spots, one per segment. It has six rows of black spines and has a pair of long, clubbed spines on the head. The chrysalis is mainly shiny white, with small black spots, a variable amount of brown markings, and orange and gold tubercules. Adults overwinter in the south and fly north each spring and summer. It has 2–3 broods per year.

Host plants
This is a list of host plants used by the variegated fritillary:
Five-wing spiderling, Boerhaavia intermedia
Arizona swallow-wort, Melastoma arizonicum
Babyslippers, Hybanthus verticillatus
Southern flax, Linum australe
Stiffstem flax, Linum rigidum
Grooved yellow flax, Linum sulcatum
Canadian moonseed, Menispermum canadense
Mexican moonseed, Menispermum mexicanum
Blue passionflower, Passiflora caerulea
Foetid passionflower, Passiflora foetida
Purple passionflower, Passiflora incarnata
Plantain, Plantago species
Mayapple, Podophyllum peltatum
Common purslane, Portulaca oleracea
Yellow alder, Turnera ulmifolia
Lance-leaf stonecrop, Sedum lanceolatum
American field pansy, Viola bicolor
Common blue violet, Viola sororia
Heartsease, Viola tricolor subspecies

References

External links

Variegated Fritillary, Butterflies of Canada

Argynnini
Butterflies of North America
Butterflies of Central America
Nymphalidae of South America
Lepidoptera of Chile
Butterflies described in 1775
Taxa named by Pieter Cramer